Knorydy  , Knorydy) is a village in the administrative district of Gmina Bielsk Podlaski, within Bielsk County, Podlaskie Voivodeship, in north-eastern Poland.

The village has a population of 430.

References

Knorydy